Bandar Abbas is a class that includes a pair of fleet supply ships operated by the Islamic Republic of Iran Navy.

Ships in the class

References 

Ship classes of the Islamic Republic of Iran Navy
Auxiliary replenishment ship classes
Auxiliary depot ship classes
Ships built in Germany
Supply ships of the Islamic Republic of Iran Navy